Sokoine University of Agriculture (SUA) is a public university in Morogoro, Tanzania, specializing in agriculture. The university is named after the country's second prime minister Edward Sokoine.

Introduction
Sokoine University of Agriculture was established on 1 July 1984 by Parliamentary Act No. 6 of 1984. Currently the University operates under the Universities Act No. 7 of 2005 and SUA Charter and Rules of 2007.

History 
The university traces its roots back to 1965 in Morogoro, where it initially began as an agriculture college offering diploma training in agricultural practices. After the dissolution of the East African Community in 1970, the University of East Africa, which was the only university in East Africa offering agriculture degrees in the region, was also dissolved. This led the Government of Tanzania to create a domestic institution, which led to the establishment of the Faculty of Agriculture at the University of Dar es Salaam. Sokoine Agriculture College fell under this umbrella and under the mandate of the University of Dar es Salaam, started to offer Bachelors of Science in Agriculture.

Further progress continued to develop in the Faculty of Agriculture; in 1974 the Division of Forestry was established and in 1976 the division of veterinary science was established. This led to the faculty's renaming to the "Faculty of Agriculture, Forestry and Veterinary Sciences". With growing enrollment numbers, the parliament decided to separate the faculty and create a fully fledged university to help boost agriculture growth in the country. Through Parliamentary Act No. 6 of 1984, the faculty was then transformed into a university and today is known as Sokoine University of Agriculture.

Campuses 
The University has five campuses namely, Edward Moringe Campus (2,376 ha) and Solomon Mahlangu Campus (1,050 ha) both in Morogoro, Olmotonyi Campus (840 ha) in Arusha, Mazumbai Campus (320 ha) in Tanga Region, Mizengo Pinda Campus in Katavi Region (64 ha) and Tunduru Campus (509 ha) in Ruvuma Region. In addition, SUA has sites for students’ field practice in Mbinga, Ruvuma Region; Mgeta (Nyandira), Morning side and Kitulanghalo Forest in Morogoro Region.

SUA has four mandates: Training, Research, Consultancy and Outreach. SUA offers training that lead to awards of certificates, diplomas, bachelors, masters, and doctorates. Non-degree programmes include Diploma in Information and Library Science, Diploma in Records, Archives and Information Management, Diploma in Animal Health and Production, Diploma in Laboratory Technology and Diploma in Information Technology.

The Sokoine National Agricultural Library is SUA's Library and the Tanzania National Agricultural Library. The library provides services to the university community and other stakeholders in the agricultural and related sectors.

Colleges and Schools 
The University has five campus colleges and two schools, namely;

 College of Agriculture; 
 College of Forestry, Wildlife and Tourism; 
 College of Veterinary Medicine and Biomedical Sciences; 
 College of Natural and Applied Sciences; 
 College of Economics and Business Studies; 
 School of Engineering and Technology; and 
 School of Education. 

These colleges and Schools offers various degree and non-degree programmes which lead to the awards of PhD, Masters, Bachelor degree, Diploma, and Certificate qualifications

Study Programmes

Undergraduate Programmes
Sokoine University of Agriculture (SUA) offers 39 Bachelor degree programmes, 6 Diploma programmes and 2 Certificates through Colleges, Schools and Departments. The following are the list of all undergraduate programmes leading to the awards of Bachelor degree, Diploma and Certificate qualifications offered at SUA in each academic unit. Detailed information about each unit and programmes structures are described in their official website

College of Agriculture

 Bachelor of Science in Agriculture General
 Bachelor of Science in Horticulture
 Bachelor of Science in Crop Production and Management
 Bachelor of Science in Agronomy
 Bachelor of Science in Animal Science
 Bachelor of Science in Aquaculture
 Bachelor of Science in Range Management
 Bachelor of Community Development
 Bachelor of Science in Applied Agricultural Extension
 Bachelor of Science in Family & Consumer Sciences
 Bachelor of Science in Human Nutrition

College of Forestry, Wildlife and Tourism

 Bachelor of Science in Forestry
 Bachelor of Science in Wildlife Management
 Bachelor of Science in Wood Technologies and Value Addition
 Bachelor of Tourism Management

College of Economics and Business Studies

 Bachelor of Science in Agricultural Economics and Agribusiness
 Bachelor of Agricultural Investment and Banking

College of Veterinary Medicine and Biomedical Sciences

 Bachelor of Veterinary Medicine
 Bachelor of Science in Biotechnology and Laboratory Sciences
 Diploma in Laboratory Technology
 Diploma in Tropical Animal Health and Production

College of Social Sciences and Humanities

 Bachelor of Rural Development
 Bachelor of Arts in Development Planning and Management

College of Natural and Applied Sciences (CONAS)

 Bachelor of Science in Environmental Sciences and Management
 Bachelor of Science in Information Technology
 Bachelor of Information and Records Management
 Bachelor of Science with Education (Agricultural Sciences and Biology)
 Bachelor of Science with Education (Chemistry and Biology)
 Bachelor of Science with Education (Chemistry and Mathematics)
 Bachelor of Science with Education (Geography and Biology)
 Bachelor of Science with Education (Geography and Mathematics)
 Bachelor of Science with Education (Informatics and Mathematics)
 Bachelor of Science with Education (Physics and Chemistry)
 Bachelor of Science with Education (Physics and Mathematics)
 Bachelor of Science with Education (Physics and Geography)
 Bachelor of Science with Education (Physics and Information Technology)
 Diploma in Records, Archives and Information Management
 Diploma in Information and Library Science
 Diploma in Information Technology
 Certificate in Information Technology

School of Engineering Science and Technology

 Bachelor of Science in Agricultural Engineering
 Bachelor of Science in Irrigation and Water Resources Engineering
 Bachelor of Science in Bioprocessing and Post harvest Engineering
 Bachelor of Science in Food Science and Technology

Mizengo Pinda Campus College - Katavi

 Bachelor of Science in Bee Resources Management
 Diploma in Crop Production and Management
 Certificate in Tour Guide and Hunting Operations

Postgraduate Programmes
Sokoine University of Agriculture offers Postgraduate Diploma, Master's and Ph.D. Programmes in all academic units as follows

College of Agriculture

 Master of Science in Crop Science
 Master of Science in Crop Protection
 Master of Science in Seed Technology and Business
 Master of Science in Horticulture
 Master of Science in Tropical Animal Production
 Master of Science in Aquaculture
 Master of Science in Soil Science and Land Management
 Master of Science in Human Nutrition
 Master of Science in Agricultural Extension
 Master of Science in Agricultural Statistics
 PhD in Soil and Water Management (Course work and Research)
 PhD Agro-Ecology (Course work and Research)
 PhD in Agricultural and Rural Innovation (PhD ARI) by Coursework and Research

College of Veterinary Medicine and Biomedical Sciences

 Master of Preventive Veterinary Medicine
 Master of Science in Public Health and Food Safety
 Master Science in Public Health Pest Management
 Master of Science in Health of Aquatic Animal Resources
 Master of Science in Applied Microbiology
 Master of Science in Animal Reproduction and Biotechnology
 Master of Science in Molecular Biology and Biotechnology
 Master of Veterinary Surgery
 Master of Science in One Health Molecular Biology
 Master of Science in Parasitology
 PhD in Veterinary Medicine and Biomedical Sciences

College of Natural and Applied Sciences

 Master of Science with Education (Mathematics)
 Master of Science with Education (Biology)
 Master of Science with Education (Chemistry)
 Master of Science in Analytical Chemistry by Research
 Master of Science in Phytochemistry
 PhD in Analytical Chemistry by Research
 PhD in Phytochemistry by Research
 PhD in Phytomedicine by Research
 PhD in Mathematics
 PhD in Library Studies
 PhD in Geography and Environmental Studies

College of Forestry, Wildlife and Tourism

 Postgraduate Diploma in Result-based Monitoring and Evaluation
 Master of Science in Wildlife Management and Conservation
 Master of Science in Forest Engineering
 Master of Science in Management of Natural Resources for Sustainable Agriculture
 Master of Science in Forest Products and Technology
 Master of Science in Forestry
 Master of Science in Agroforestry
 Master of Science in Ecosystems Science and Management
 Master of Science in Forest Resources Assessment and Management
 PhD in Forest Sciences

College of Social Sciences and Humanities

 Master of Arts in Rural Development
 Master of Arts in Project Management and Evaluation
 Master of Arts in Development Planning and Policy Analysis
 PhD in Policy Planning and Management
 PhD in Rural Development

College of Economics and Business Studies

 Postgraduate Diploma in Agricultural Economics
 Master of Science in Agricultural Economics
 Master of Science in Agricultural and Applied Economics
 Master of Business Administration (MBA) – Agribusiness
 Master of Business Administration – Evening Programme
 PhD in Agribusiness (Course work and research)
 PhD in Agricultural Economics (Research)

School of Engineering and Technology

 Master of Science in Post Harvest Engineering and Management
 Master of Science in Agricultural Engineering
 Master of Science in Irrigation Engineering and Management
 Master of Science in Land Use Planning Management
 Master of Science in Food Science
 Master of Science in Food Quality and Safety Assurance

School of Education

 Postgraduate Diploma in Education
 Master of Educational Curriculum and Instruction
 PhD in Education

Doctor of Philosophy
The University offers PhD programmes by Research and Thesis in all academic units (School and Colleges). Doctorate degrees are offered in various areas of specialization including Doctor of Philosophy (PhD), Postdoctoral Studies, Doctor of Science and the Doctor of honoris causa.

In-service programmes
The Institute of Continues Education (ICE) in collaboration with faculties, centers and other institutes offers short-term in-service programmes to field and operational staff as well as training and extension services to farmers and community leaders. It also coordinates outreach programmes.

References 
    6. http://www.lib.sua.ac.tz/

External links
 

 
Public universities in Tanzania
Agricultural universities and colleges in Tanzania
Educational institutions established in 1984
Universities in Morogoro
Forestry education
Association of African Universities
1984 establishments in Tanzania